is a biography series produced by Tsuburaya Productions created to commemorate the 45th anniversary of the Ultra Series. The show first premiered on TV Tokyo on July 6, 2011 and was in syndication for two years. The show features clips from past Ultra Series shows.

The new season of the show is titled  and premiered on July 3, 2013. Starting from April 2, 2016, New Ultraman Retsuden changed its broadcasting schedule from 6:00 pm in the Tuesday to 9:00 am in Saturday. Said change is also a part of the 50th anniversary celebration of the Ultra Series. The series was put to an end in late June 2016 except for its final nine episodes (147-155), and it previewed the then-upcoming 2016 Ultra Series, Ultraman Orb.

Characters 
: The main navigator of Ultraman Retsuden.

Featured heroes

Other heroes

Episodes

Ultra Zero Fight 
To draw success to the film Ultraman Saga, A new segment to the series that started in episode 57 debuted entitled . Ultra Zero Fight is an Action/Drama series of 3-minute episodes that showcased new forms that the main character, Ultraman Zero acquires as he faces his adversaries. The segment itself is a tribute to the low-budget minisodes of Ultra Fight.
Parts
: 8 episodes. From episode 57 to episode 64.
: 15 episodes. From episode 76 to episode 91 (excluding episode 79).

Ultraman Ginga 
 is part of New Ultraman Retsuden comprising episodes 2-7 and 21-25, and with the Theatrical Special being aired as episodes 50 and 51.

Mega Monster Rush: Ultra Frontier 
 is part of New Ultraman Retsuden and is a fully CG movie of 3-minute episodes. It is an adaption of the video game of the same title.
Parts
Red King Hunting: 3 episodes. From episode 12 to episode 14.
Neronga Hunting: 2 episodes. From episode 15 to episode 16.
Antlar Hunting: 4 episodes. From episode 29 to episode 32.
From episode 52 to episode 54.
From episode 63 to episode 65.
From episode 66 to episode 67.
Plasma Killer Zaurus Hunting: 1 episode with subtitle; . Episode 68.

Ultraman Ginga S 
 is part of New Ultraman Retsuden comprising episodes 55-62 and 71-78, and with the movie having been broadcast as episodes 139-141.

Ultra Fight Victory 
 is part of New Ultraman Retsuden and is a series of 3-minute episodes that featured a new form of the main character. The series itself is a tribute to the low-budget minisodes of Ultra Fight.

Ultraman X 
 is part of New Ultraman Retsuden comprising episodes 106-130, with episodes 113, 121, and 130 being recap specials.

Cast 
Ultraman Retsuden
: 
: 
: 

: 
: 

New Ultraman Retsuden
: 
: 
: 
: 
: 
: 
: 
: 
:

Voice actors 
Ultraman Retsuden
: Mamoru Miyano
: 
: 
: 
: 
: 
: 
: 
: 
Narration: , 

New Ultraman Retsuden
: 
: 
Zoffy (1): Hideyuki Tanaka
: 
Ultraman Zero (9, 11, 14, 19, 28-33, 46, 47, 96-104, 139-141, 148, 150, 151, 155): Mamoru Miyano
Glenfire (9, 11, 34, 100, 101, 104), : Tomokazu Seki
: 
, Alien Hipporit "Jathar of the Hell" (49): Tetsuo Kishi
: 
, : 
: 
, : 
Alien Mephilas "Sly of the Dark Magic" (48, 49): Hiroki Yasumoto
Alien Temperor "Villainous of the Villainy" (48, 49), : Holly Kaneko
Ultraman Belial (49): Yūki Ono
: 
: 
: 
: 
Narration: Yasunori Matsumoto (105), Kensuke Takahashi (113, 121, 130)

Songs 
Opening themes of Ultraman Retsuden

Lyrics:  
Composition & Arrangement: 
Artist: Voyager feat. Ultraman Zero (Mamoru Miyano)
Episodes: 1-13
"DREAM FIGHTER"
Composition: 
Arrangement: 
Lyrics & Artist: Mamoru Miyano
Episodes: 14-20, 26-39 (Verse 1), 21-25 (Verse 2)
"Rising High"
Lyrics & Composition: 
Arrangement: Toshihiko Takamizawa with 
Artist: Voyager
Episodes: 40-52
"ULTRA STEEL"
Lyrics & Composition: Toshihiko Takamizawa
Arrangement: Toshihiko Takamizawa with Yuichiro Honda
Artist: Takamiy
Episodes: 53-65
"ULTRA FLY"
Composition: Hisashi Koyama
Arrangement: Koichiro Takahashi
Lyrics & Artist: Mamoru Miyano
Episodes: 66-78
"Final Wars!"
Lyrics & Composition: Toshihiko Takamizawa
Arrangement: Toshihiko Takamizawa with Yuichiro Honda
Artist: The Alfee
Episodes: 79-90 (Verse 1), 91-104 (Verse 2)
Opening theme of New Ultraman Retsuden

Lyrics & Composition: Toshihiko Takamizawa
Arrangement: Toshihiko Takamizawa with Yuichiro Honda
Artist: Takamiy with Mamoru Miyano
Episodes: 1-7, 14-20 (Verse 1), 8-13, 21-26 (Verse 2)
"ULTRA BRAVE"
Lyrics: DAIGO
Composition: Toshihiko Takamizawa
Artist: DAIGO with Takamiy
Episodes: 27-39

Lyrics: Hideki Tama
Composition & Arrangement: Takao Konishi
Artist: Voyager feat. Ultraman Ginga (Tomokazu Sugita)
Episodes: 40-52 (Verse 1), 53, 54 (Verse 2)

Lyrics & Composition: Toshihiko Takamizawa
Arrangement: Toshihiko Takamizawa with Yuichiro Honda
Artist: The Alfee
Episodes: 55-70 (Verse 1), 71-78 (Verse 2)

Lyrics: Hideki Tama, 
Composition & Arrangement: Takao Konishi
Artist: Voyager with Hikaru & Show (Takuya Negishi & Kiyotaka Uji) feat. Takamiy
Episodes: 79-90

Lyrics: Sei Okazaki
Composition & Arrangement: Takao Konishi
Artist: Voyager with Hikaru & Show (Takuya Negishi & Kiyotaka Uji) feat. Takamiy
Episodes: 91-105

Lyrics: 
Composition & Arrangement: Takao Konishi
Artist: Voyager feat. Daichi Ozora (Kensuke Takahashi) / Voyager feat. Project DMM
Episodes: 106-121 (Verse 1), 122-130 (Verse 2) / 131-142

Lyrics: TAKERU, 
Composition & Arrangement: Takao Konishi
Artist: Voyager feat. Project DMM
Episodes: 143-155

Notes

References

External links 
Official New Ultraman Retsuden site  at TV Tokyo 
Official Ultraman Retsuden site at TV Tokyo 
Official Ultraman Retsuden blog at Tsuburaya Productions 

2011 Japanese television series debuts
Ultra television series
TV Tokyo original programming
2016 Japanese television series endings